The 1900 Michigan Agricultural Aggies football team represented Michigan Agricultural College (MAC) in the 1900 college football season. In their second year under head coach Charles Bemies, the Aggies compiled a 1–3 record and were outscored by their opponents 67 to 51.

Schedule

References

Michigan Agricultural
Michigan State Spartans football seasons
Michigan Agricultural Aggies football